Matt Sexton is a former New Zealand rugby union player and head coach of the  Super Rugby franchise, as well as the  Currie Cup team. He is currently a talent identification coach for the New Zealand Rugby Union.

Playing career
He made his debut for Canterbury in 1991, eventually making 128 appearances in his 10 years there. This included him leading Canterbury on their 1994 tour of the United Kingdom.

He was also a member of the  Super Rugby franchise in their first six seasons in the competition, although he missed the 2000 Super 12 season through injury.

In 2001, he joined Irish province Ulster, where he played for three seasons under head coach Alan Solomons. He also played for the Barbarians under Solomons in 2003 and 2004.

Coaching career
He then went into coaching, becoming the Academy manager at Canterbury (where he was the coach of the Crusaders Knights, the development squad of the Crusaders), the Tasman Rugby Union and was also on the coaching team for the New Zealand team in the 2009 IRB Junior World Championship.

However, on 30 July 2013, Solomons left the Kings to take up the role of Head Coach of Edinburgh Rugby. On 15 December, Sexton also announced that he was leaving the Kings so that he could return to his home country New Zealand, where he took up a role as a talent identification coach with the New Zealand Rugby Union.

References

New Zealand rugby union coaches
New Zealand rugby union players
Living people
1970 births
Ulster Rugby players